Lake Davis is an artificial lake in Plumas County, California near the Sierra Nevada community of Portola.  Its waters are impounded by Grizzly Valley Dam, which was completed in 1966 as part of the California State Water Project. The lake is named for Lester T. Davis (1906-1952).

Hydrology
The lake discharges into Big Grizzly Creek, a tributary of the Middle Fork Feather River.

Grizzly Valley Dam

The California Department of Water Resources manages the dam.

Recreation
Located in Plumas National Forest, Lake Davis is the centerpiece of the Lake Davis Recreation Area, which supports boating, campground camping, cross-country skiing, fishing, hunting, mountain biking, picnicking, snowmobiling, swimming, and wildlife viewing.

Northern pike
During 1996-97 Lake Davis was in the national spotlight due to controversy over northern pike and the possibility of poisoning the lake. Following an explosion of the pike population, and the California Department of Fish and Game (DFG) decided to treat the reservoir with rotenone, a naturally occurring poison deadly to gilled creatures.

After the first attempt failed to eradicate the pike and the population rebounded, the DFG again utilized rotenone in September 2007, after lowering the water level. DFG's justification for the action was their concern that pike might escape the lake and enter the Sacramento River system, potentially harming native anadromous fish species such as steelhead and salmon. The effort was controversial because pike are popular gamefish and considerable effort had already been spent on unsuccessful attempts to rid the lake of pike using explosives, nets, shocking, and poison.

Since the 2007 treatment, there have been no confirmed cases of northern pike in the lake.

See also
 List of dams and reservoirs in California
 List of lakes in California

References

Reservoirs in Plumas County, California
Davis
Davis
1966 establishments in California